Sakae (written: 栄, 榮 or さかえ in hiragana) is a unisex Japanese given name. Notable people with the name include:

Surname
Juliana Sakae Brazilian journalist and filmmaker 
, Japanese wrestling coach and retired wrestler
, Japanese pop singer

Name
, Japanese manga artist
, Japanese playwright and director
, Japanese activist
, Mongolian sumo wrestler
, Japanese field hockey player
, Japanese military officer
, Japanese long-distance runner
, Japanese anarchist
, Japanese writer
Sakae Takahashi, Japanese politician
, Japanese footballer
, Japanese photographer
, Japanese photographer
, Japanese writer and poet

Japanese unisex given names
Japanese-language surnames